The word kike is an ethnic slur for a Jew.

Etymology
The earliest recorded use of the word dates to the 1880s.

According to the Oxford English Dictionary, it may be an alteration of the endings –ki or –ky common in the personal names of Jews in eastern Europe who immigrated to the United States in the early 20th century. A variation or expansion of this theory published in Our Crowd, by Stephen Birmingham, postulates that the term "kike" was coined as a put-down by the assimilated U.S. Jews from Germany to identify eastern European and Russian Jews: "Because many Russian [Jewish] names ended in 'ki', they were called 'kikes'—a German Jewish contribution to the American vernacular. The name then proceeded to be co-opted by non-Jews as it gained prominence in its usage in society, and was later used as a general derogatory slur."

The Encyclopedia of Swearing suggests that Leo Rosten's suggestion is the most likely. He stated that:

Compounding the mysterious origin of this term, in 1864 in the UK the word ike or ikey was used as a derogatory term for Jews, which derived from the name "Isaac", a common Jewish name.

Usage
Some sources say that the first use was on Ellis Island as a term for Jewish people, others that it was used primarily by Jewish-Americans to put down Jewish immigrants.

In a travel report from 1937 for the German-Jewish publication Der Morgen, Joachim Prinz, writing of the situation of Jewish immigrants in the US, mentions the word as being used by Jews to refer contemptuously to other (Eastern) Jews:

 It is not uplifting to see how confused the perceptions are, how little the immigrants have learnt, how happy some of them are to have escaped the life of a Jew [or: the Jewish fate], and how haughty many of them are. It is saddening that they are very unpopular in many circles, and bewildering is the stupidity of those who contemptuously call the Eastern Jews (who support them after all!) "kikes" […]

See also

 Kikeout Mountain
 List of common nouns derived from ethnic group names
 List of ethnic slurs
 Profanity
 Yid

References

External links

Antisemitic slurs
English words